Loch Valley is a loch in Galloway Forest Park to the east of Buchan Hill, north of the Rig of the Jarkness and southwest of Craignaw. It drains via Gairland Burn down to Loch Trool.

The loch has a catchment area entirely on the Loch Doon granite, is oligotrophic, and has suffered from gradual acidification since the mid-19th century leading to the elimination of the original Brown Trout population. It has recovered to some extent, with the pH increasing slowly from around 4.4 in 1978 to 5.2 in 2003.

Between 1983 and 2003 the loch's dissolved organic carbon levels increased, and the loch had a sediment accumulation rate of around 0.01 g cm−2 yr−1 from 1850 to 1975.

Water Analysis

References

Valley